The Governor William J. Bulow House, located at 207 W. Hemlock St. in Beresford, South Dakota, was built in 1893.  It was listed on the National Register of Historic Places in 1986.

See also
Governor Leslie Jensen House, Hot Spring, South Dakota, also NRHP-listed
Governor John L. Pennington House, Yankton, South Dakota, also NRHP-listed

References

South Dakota
Houses on the National Register of Historic Places in South Dakota
Houses in Union County, South Dakota
Houses completed in 1898
National Register of Historic Places in Union County, South Dakota